Daniel Hanslik (born 6 October 1996) is a German professional footballer who plays as a forward for 1. FC Kaiserslautern.

Club career

Youth career
Hanslik grew up in the northeast of Hesse and was trained in football from the age of four at the local clubs SV Unterhaun, SV Steinbach and JFV Bad Hersfeld, where he mainly played in defense. At Bad Hersfeld and Steinbach, Hanslik, who was initially used in midfield in addition to the attack, had his first experiences in the men's division in the sixth class Verbandsliga Hessen and in the Hessenliga. As a result, Hanslik even played for Arsenal, but was not signed for the club's youth teams.

First experiences in the Regionalliga
Scoring 33 goals in 64 competitive games for both clubs, VfL Wolfsburg became aware of the attacker and signed him in the summer of 2017. Hanslik's advisor at the time, Kujtim Mustafi, father of the German national player Shkodran Mustafi, arranged the contact to the club. There, Hanslik trained more often with the professionals during the international or winter breaks, but was only used in the Regionalliga team. Here, Hanslik continued to prove his scoring threat and scored 30 goals in 52 competitive games. He was able to net three times in the two relegation games to the 3. Liga against FC Bayern Munich II in spring 2019.

Career jump into the 2. Bundesliga
The next step in his career followed for the striker, when he was signed by the 2. Bundesliga club Holstein Kiel for three years in March 2019. In the 1–1 draw against FC Erzgebirge Aue on 1 September 2019, 22-year old Hanslik was in the starting line-up, making it his first time in professional football.

During the winter break, Kiel loaned the attacker to 3. Liga club FC Hansa Rostock until the end of the season. During the second half of the season, Hanslik made 17 appearances (three goals) in Rostock and one in the 2019–20 Verbandspokal.

On 5 October 2020, Hanslik was loaned out again, this time to fellow 3. Liga club 1. FC Kaiserslautern until the end of the 2020–21 season. Hanslik scored the winning goal for Kaiserslautern in their promotion playoff against Dynamo Dresden, helping the team to earn promotion to the 2. Bundesliga for the first time since 2018.

Career statistics

References

Living people
1996 births
Association football forwards
German footballers
VfL Wolfsburg II players
Holstein Kiel II players
Holstein Kiel players
FC Hansa Rostock players
1. FC Kaiserslautern players
2. Bundesliga players
3. Liga players
Regionalliga players
People from Bad Hersfeld
Sportspeople from Kassel (region)
Footballers from Hesse